Yusuf Yaska (1592-1636) was a Kurdish poet, considered, along with Mistefa Bêsaranî, to be one of the early members of Gorani poetry after Mele Perîşan. The content of his ghazals were about love and nature. Little is known about his personal life, yet Minorsky wrote that Yaska was executed by immurement after his master Khan Ahmad Khan Ardalan of Ardalan suspected him of dallying with his wife, daughter of Shah Abbas.

Poetry 
Yaska is the founder of a literary school that focuses more on local poetic traditions, using a decasyllabic meter and a caesura between two rhyming hemistiches. This composition was common in folk poetry in Ardalan. Khana Qubadi would become a major poet in this school.

Poem, Yaska asks 
A poem by Yaska, translated to English in 2005:

References 

Kurdish poets

1592 births
1636 deaths
Year of birth unknown
17th-century Kurdish people

Executed Kurdish people